Chaamp is a 2017 Indian Bengali-language sports action drama film directed by Raj Chakraborty with story written by Dev. Produced by Dev, the film stars him in the lead role, along with Rukmini Maitra, in her debut film and Chiranjeet Chakraborty, Priyanka Sarkar, Kamaleswar Mukherjee who stars in other pivotal roles. After releasing initially in West Bengal on 23 June 2017, the film released all over India on 30 June 2017.
The concept of the film was penned by Dev.

Plot
Shibaji, a famous Indian boxer, loses fame overnight when he meets a tragic accident that ruins his boxing career. After losing his title, he fights all odds to revive his career and become a champion again.

Cast
 Dev as Shibaji "Shiba" Sanyal ; A boxer
 Rukmini Maitra as Jaya Sanyal ; Shiba's wife
 Chiranjeet Chakraborty as Coach Buro Bagchi
 Laboni Sarkar as Shiba's mother
 Supriyo Dutta as Narukaka ; A local grocer
 Priyanka Sarkar as Sathi Bagchi ; 
 Kamaleswar Mukherjee as Reporter Shantanu ; Main Antagonist
 Padmanava Dasgupta as Shantanu's friend
 Biplab Chatterjee as Chacha
 Krishnokishore Mukhopadhyay as Mr. Sanyal ; Jaya's Dad
 Joydip Kundu as a businessman
 Akbar Hasan as Prashant Singh ; A boxer and Shiba's rival
 Animesh Badhuri as a businessman
 Arjun Dasgupta as a doctor
 Raj Chakraborty as Swathi's husband / Cameo Appearance

Production
In September 2016, The Times of India reported that Dev was going to launch Rukmini Maitra through a new production of his directed by Raj Chakraborty. It was reported that boxing is the main core of the film, with Dev playing the role of a boxer and Chiranjeet, playing the role of a retired boxer who wants to fulfill his dream through Dev's character.

The film is Dev's debut production with his company, Dev Entertainment Ventures.

Release 
The film released in West Bengal on 23 June 2017, and released in the rest of India on 30 June 2017. The film was distributed by SVF Entertainment in India.

Critical reception 
The Times of India praised the film, giving Chaamp 3.5 stars out of 5 and calling the film a must watch. Their review praised the directing by Raj Chakraborty, saying that the film shows his coming of age as a director. Despite calling him "deadpan as usual", the review notes that Dev has been played to his strengths and has the perfect body language. Rukmini Maitra was praised for a debut performance, being called a natural in the review. The rest of the cast was commended for their performances, including Chiranjeet Chakraborty, Priyanka Sarkar, Kamaleshwar Mukherjee, and Supriyo Dutta. The review also commended the crew, specifically cinematographer Soumik Halder, art director Tanmoy Chakraborty and editor Md Kalam. However, the film's story was criticized for its similarities to Sultan, a 2016 Hindi film also about the comeback of an athlete. Dev told they wanted to do a film based on a Moti Nandi's story but didn’t get the rights to it, hence Chaamp was made.

Soundtrack

There are 2 additional songs by Raftaar and Anupam Roy which were not in the film but in the soundtrack. The soundtrack was initially released on Saavn on 14 May 2017, and was later released on other streaming services like Apple Music on 10 June 2017.

Jeet Gannguli, one of the composers of the soundtrack, expressed disappointment with the inclusion of Anupam Roy and Raftaar on the soundtrack. He explained that he initially composed four tracks for the soundtrack, and felt that since he had already done that, he should complete the soundtrack by composing the rest of the music. Gannguli further explained that he is not fond of the trend of hiring multiple composers for a single soundtrack album, a trend which has become popular in the Hindi film industry.

Album critical reception 
"Jaya Tomari" has been described as a runaway hit, and was commended along with "Maula Re" and "Tumio Chaamp".

Accolades 
The film was nominated for multiple awards at the 2018 Filmfare Awards East.

|-
| 2018
| Dev
| Best Actor
| Filmfare Award
| 
| Filmfare Awards East
| 
|-
| 2018
| Arijit Singh
| Best Singer (Male)
| Filmfare Award
| 
| Filmfare Awards East
| 
|-
| 2018
| Rukmini Maitra
| Best Debut (Female)
| Filmfare Award
| 
| Filmfare Awards EastAlso for the film Cockpit
|

See also 
 List of highest-grossing Bengali films
 List of Bengali films of 2017

References

External links
 

2017 films
Bengali-language Indian films
2010s Bengali-language films
Indian boxing films
Indian sports drama films
Films scored by Jeet Ganguly
Films scored by Anupam Roy
Films scored by Raftaar
2010s sports drama films
Films directed by Raj Chakraborty
Films produced by Dev (Bengali actor)
2017 drama films